Air Djibouti, also known as Red Sea Airlines, is the flag carrier of Djibouti. It first flew in 1963 and ceased all operations in 2002. In 2015, the airline was relaunched, first as a cargo airline and then, in 2016, with passenger services as well. It is headquartered in the capital, Djibouti.

History

Air Djibouti (1963–1970)

A brand new Douglas DC-3 helped the airline starting services between Dire Dawa and Aden, Addis Ababa and Taiz. The successfulness of this service prompted the airline to buy five more DC-3s from Air Liban, which rapidly replaced the smaller aircraft in the fleet. The carriage of mail and personal for the government and charter and Hajj flights complemented the carrier's revenues. A five-seater Aérospatiale Alouette III helicopter was purchased in 1969.

Air Djibouti–Red Sea Airlines (1971–2002)
In 1977, following the independence of Djibouti, the government boosted its participation in the carrier to 62.5%; Air France held 32.29% and banks and private investors held the balance. At July 1980, the number of employees was 210 and the fleet consisted of two Twin Otter aircraft. At this time, a domestic network was served along with international flights to Aden, Hodeida and Taiz; Addis Ababa, Cairo and Jeddah were also served in conjunction with Air France. With a fleet of two DC-9-30s and two Twin Otters, at March 1990 Air Djibouti had Abu Dhabi, Aden, Addis Ababa, Cairo, Dire Dawa, Hargeisa, Jeddah, Nairobi, Paris, Rome and Sana'a as part of the airline's international network, and flew domestically to Obock and Tadjoura. The president was Aden Robleh Awaleh, who employed 229. The airline ceased operations in 1991.

The carrier was refounded in 1997 and operations started again in  using a leased ex-Kuwait Airways 194-seater Airbus A310-200. At March 2000, the A310 was deployed on scheduled routes to Addis Ababa, Asmara, Cairo, Dar-es-Salaam, Dubai, Jeddah, Johannesburg, Karachi, Khartoum, Mogadishu, Mombasa, Muscat, Nairobi, Rome and Taiz. Operations ceased in 2002.

Relaunch
Air Djibouti was set to relaunch service in late 2015 and 2016 with Chairman Aboubaker Omar Hadi and CEO Mario Fulgoni. The company is also supported by South Wales-based Cardiff Aviation.
In late 2015 Air Djibouti relaunched service with a Boeing 737 freighter. The government wishes to establish the country as a regional logistics and commercial hub for trade in East Africa, and chose to relaunch the airline as part of this plan. The airline started regional services with the Boeing 737-400 on 16 August 2016 and planned to introduce two British Aerospace 146-300 aircraft before the end of 2016.

Destinations
, Air Djibouti served the following destinations.

Fleet

Current
Air Djibouti relaunched service in 2015 using a wet-leased Fokker 27. In 2016, the company leased a Boeing 737-400 from Cardiff Aviation, which was the first aircraft the new airline operated. Air Djibouti later entered a wet-lease for  a BAe 146-300. By September 2017, all three aircraft had been returned to their lessors.

Historic fleet
In the 1960s, the airline operated Douglas DC-3s, a Beechcraft Model 18, and a Beechcraft Musketeer. In the early 1970s, the fleet also included a Douglas DC-6; the two Beechcrafts had been replaced by a Bell JetRanger helicopter, and a Piper Cherokee Six.

Before operations were suspended Air Djibouti operated 1 Airbus A310 and 5 Boeing 737-200 aircraft.

Accidents and incidents
The aircraft was operating a domestic flight from Tadjoura Airport to Djibouti–Ambouli International Airport. All four people on board survived.
On 17 October 1977, two gunmen entered an Air Djibouti de Havilland Canada DHC-6 Twin Otter at Tadjoura Airport shortly before the aircraft's planned take-off, shooting the pilot and one passenger.
On August 17, 1986, a leased Boeing 737-200 (OO-SBQ) was intercepted by two fighter aircraft from the South Yemeni Air Force and forced to land in Aden. There it was ransacked by security forces and one person was arrested. Due to the incident, the Republic of Djibouti broke off diplomatic relations with South Yemen.

See also
Transport in Djibouti

References

Bibliography

External links

Airlines of Djibouti
Airlines established in 1962
Airlines disestablished in 2002
Government-owned airlines
Airlines established in 2015
1962 establishments in Africa
2002 disestablishments in Africa
2015 establishments in Djibouti
Companies based in Djibouti (city)